Armenia is subdivided into eleven administrative divisions. Of these, ten are provinces, known as marzer or in the singular form marz in Armenian.

Yerevan is treated separately and granted special administrative status as the country's capital.  The chief executive in each of 10 marzes is the marzpet, appointed by the government of Armenia. In Yerevan, the chief executive is the mayor, elected by the Yerevan City Council.

First-level administrative divisions
The following is a list of the provinces with population, area, and density information. Figures are from the Statistical Committee of Armenia.

Municipalities (hamaynkner) 

Within each province of the republic, there are municipal communities (hamaynkner, singular hamaynk), currently considered the second-level administrative division in Armenia. Each municipality - known officially as community, either rural or urban- is a self-governing entity and consists of one or more settlements (bnakavayrer, singular bnakavayr). The settlements are classified as either towns (kaghakner, singular kaghak) or villages (gyugher, singular gyugh). As of January 2018, Armenia is divided into 503 communities, of which 46 are urban and 457 are rural. The capital, Yerevan, also holds the status of a community. Additionally, Yerevan is divided into twelve semi-autonomous districts.

Terminology

See also

 Districts of the Armenian Soviet Socialist Republic
 Administrative divisions of the Republic of Artsakh
 ISO 3166-2:AM
 List of Armenian provinces by Human Development Index

References

External links 
 Statistical Committee of Armenia
 Armenia Provinces on Statoids.com

 
Armenia
Armenia
Armenia
Administrative divisions